Heart on a Wall is a solo album by Blondie keyboardist and composer Jimmy Destri, released on Chrysalis Records in 1981. It remains unreleased on compact disc.

Overview
After Blondie's 1980 album Autoamerican, the band members took a break from both recording and touring as a group. The band's three principal songwriters, Deborah Harry, Chris Stein and Jimmy Destri instead recorded two solo projects: Harry, together with Stein, recording her debut solo album KooKoo with Chic's Bernard Edwards and Nile Rodgers, and Destri his first solo album. 

Heart on a Wall was produced by Michael Kamen, then regarded mainly as a film composer/arranger; Kamen also played keyboards and sang backup vocals. The album also featured numerous renowned musicians, including guitarists Carlos Alomar (David Bowie, Paul McCartney, Mick Jagger, Iggy Pop), Tommy Morrongiello (Bob Dylan, Blue Öyster Cult, Ian Hunter) and Earl Slick (Bowie, John Lennon, Yoko Ono), along with bassist John Siegler (Todd Rundgren's Utopia).  In addition, the album features contributions from his Blondie bandmates, with Clem Burke providing drums, and Chris Stein and Debbie Harry performing in "guest appearance" roles. Destri himself, not limiting himself to his trademark keyboards, also performs guitar on the album.

Heart on a Wall was released in the US, the UK and France (Chrysalis CHR-1368) as well as Australia and New Zealand (L-37774), West Germany (204 425-320) and the Netherlands (204 425). "Living In Your Heart" backed with "Don't Look Around" was also released as a 7" single in France (PB-8865).

Any digital release of the album remains highly unlikely, as the original master tapes have been lost.

Track listing
All tracks written by Jimmy Destri

Side A:
"Bad Dreams" – 3:21
"Don't Look Around" – 4:35
"Living in Your Heart" – 5:01
"My Little World" – 5:47

Side B:
"Little Metal Drummer" - 4:19
"Numbers Don't Count (On Me)" - 3:34
"The King of Steam" - 4:20
"Under the Ice" - 4:07
"Heart on a Wall" - 2:43

Personnel
 Jimmy Destri - vocals, keyboards, guitar, backing vocals 
 Clem Burke - drums
 Tommy Morrongiello - left guitar
 Earl Slick - center guitar
 Carlos Alomar - right guitar, backing vocals
 John Siegler - bass
 Michael Kamen - keyboards, backing vocals
 Chris Stein - harmonica, lead guitar on "Little Metal Drummer"
 Donna Destri - backing vocals
 Debbie Harry - backing vocals
 Sasha Kamen - backing vocals
 Joey Wilson - backing vocals

Production

 Michael Kamen - producer for Mother Fortune Inc.
 Recorded in New York at The Hit Factory
 Mixed by Jimmy Destri and Robert Clifford with John Davenport and Jon Smith
 Mastered at Sterling Sound by Greg Calbi
 Art direction and photography by Lynn Goldsmith
 Logistics: Ace Penna
 Production assistance: Susan Kaplow
 Bullpen: Bert Padell, Bob Emmer, Marty Silfen, Eddie Germano, Bill George, Brendan and Jeff
 Originally released as Chrysalis CHR 1368

Chart Peaks

References

1981 debut albums
Chrysalis Records albums